Evander Holyfield vs. John Ruiz II, billed as The Last Word, was a professional boxing match contested on March 3, 2001 for the WBA heavyweight championship.

Background
After his controversial victory over Ruiz the previous August the WBA ordered new Heavyweight Champion Holyfield to make his first defence of his title a rematch against Ruiz.

The fight
The judges saw Ruiz as the clear winner, with Stanley Christodoulou scoring it 116–110; Chuck Giampa, 115–111; and Patricia Jarman-Manning, 114–111, making him the first Latino boxer to have won a heavyweight world title.

In the tenth round following several uneventful ones, Holyfield pressed Ruiz and scored a plethora of good hits; however, he halted his own momentum when he threw a low blow. The punch to the crotch caused Ruiz to double over, and he was given a few minutes to recover after a point was deducted from Holyfield. When the bout resumed, an apparently still angry Ruiz exchanged some blows with Holyfield before throwing his own low blows, causing him to be deducted a point as well. 

Going into the eleventh round, both boxers had bruising and swelling, but Ruiz seemed the more hurt of the two and had also been cut. The eleventh would prove the most eventful round as Ruiz, who had stuck to jabbing and clinching for most of the fight, came out strong and landed several power punches on Holyfield. Ruiz knocked the disoriented Holyfield down with a straight right halfway into the round. Holyfield beat the count to get up, but was weak in the legs and mostly clung to Ruiz for the remainder of the round (losing his own footing and going back to the canvas twice- both ruled slips rather than knockdowns). Ruiz continued to land power shots on the dazed Holyfield at will, additionally opening up a cut next to his left eye.

The twelfth round began with Ruiz dominating and connecting with nearly every jab he threw, Holyfield's defense clearly slipping. Holyfield went back on the offensive and both boxers landed power punches in between bouts of clinching and body punching, with Ruiz generally getting the better of the exchanges over the still shaky Holyfield. When the round ended, Ruiz returned to his corner with his hands raised in triumph while Holyfield returned to his corner while staring at his feet. Before the decision was announced, Ruiz embraced Holyfield, returned to his corner, and retrieved  a Puerto Rican flag which he then waved in the center of the ring.

Aftermath
Despite the title of fight being the "Last Word" the two would fight again in December, with another controversial decision allowing Ruiz to retain the title with a draw.

Undercard
Confirmed bouts:

References

2001 in boxing
Boxing in Las Vegas
2001 in sports in Nevada
World Boxing Association heavyweight championship matches
March 2001 sports events in the United States
Ruiz 2